1,2-Dibromo-3-chloropropane or DBCP is the active ingredient in the nematicide Nemagon, also known as Fumazone.

DBCP may also refer to:

 Data Buoy Cooperation Panel, a joint initiative concerned with drifting and moored ocean data buoys; see Global Drifter Program